Sawad is a historical region in present-day southern Iraq.

Sawad (Arabic for black) may refer to:

Places
 Al-Sawad, or Terre de Suète, an historical region east of the Sea of Galilee
 Sawad, Bhiwandi, a village in India
 Sawad, Yemen, a village in Yemen

People
 Bharat Sawad (1968–?), Nepalese weightlifter
 Chandra Sawad (born 1991), Nepalese cricketer
 Fadhel Al Sawad, Bahraini attorney and politician

Other uses
 Another name for the Samant, feudal kings of the Doti region in Nepal

See also
 Saud (disambiguation)
 Sawada, a Japanese surname
 Sawade, a village in Maharashtra, India